The Sanjak of Dedeağaç (Ottoman Turkish: Liva-i Dedeağaç), originally in 1878–1884 the Sanjak of Dimetoka (Liva-i Dimetoka, Υποδιοίκησις Διδυμοτείχου), was a second-level province (sanjak) of the Ottoman Empire in Thrace, forming part of the Adrianople Vilayet. Its capital was Dedeağaç, modern Alexandroupolis in Greece.

History and administrative division 
The sanjak was created in 1878 out of the territory of the sanjaks of Gallipoli and Adrianople, as well as the island of Samothrace, which had hitherto belonged to the Vilayet of the Archipelago. The capital was originally at Dimetoka (Didymoteicho), but was moved to Dedeağaç (Alexandroupolis) in 1884. Dimetoka itself later returned under the sanjak of Adrianople. 

It comprised three sub-provinces or kazas, which were further subdivided into nahiyes:
 Kaza of Dedeağaç (mod. Alexandroupolis): Ferecik, Mekri, Sahinler, Samothrace (Tr. Semendrek), Doğanhišar
 Kaza of Sofulu (mod. Soufli):  Pitikli, Pessani|Pisman, Kamberler-i Bala, Dervent, Ede, Ipsala
 Kaza of Enez: Enez or Koca Ali.

Of these, the kaza of Dedeağaç and most of the kaza of Sofulu lie today in Greece, while the kaza of Enez with the parts of the kaza of Sofulu east of the Evros river lie in Turkey.

The sanjak survived until it was occupied by Bulgarian troops in the First Balkan War (1912–1913), after which the portion west of the Evros became a Bulgarian (and after 1919, Greek) province, while the eastern remained under Turkish control (except for the period 1919–1922, when it was under Allied and then Greek control).

References

Sanjaks of the Ottoman Empire in Europe
Ottoman Greece
History of Edirne Province
History of Western Thrace
1878 establishments in the Ottoman Empire
Alexandroupolis
Ottoman Thrace
Adrianople vilayet
1912 disestablishments in the Ottoman Empire